The Girl in Pink Tights is a musical comedy with music by Sigmund Romberg; lyrics by Leo Robin; and a musical book by Jerome Chodorov and Joseph Fields. The musical opened on Broadway on March 5, 1954 at the Mark Hellinger Theatre where it ran for a total of 115 performances until it closed on June 12, 1954. 

The production was produced and directed by Shepard Traube, choreographed by Agnes De Mille, used set and light designs by Eldon Elder, costume designs by Miles White, and conducted by musical director Sylvan Levin. The cast was led by Charles Goldner as Maestro Gallo, Zizi Jeanmaire as Lisette Gervais, David Atkinson as Clyde Hallam, Alexandre Kalioujny as Volodya Kuzentsov, Brenda Lewis as Lotta Leslie, Robert Smith as Van Beuren, and David Aiken as Eddington.

Aborted film version
In 1954, Marilyn Monroe was placed on suspension from 20th Century-Fox after refusing to accept the lead role in a film called “Pink Tights. This had nothing to do with the Broadway musical and was an original script with a score by Jule Styne and Sammy Cahn.  During her suspension, she married baseball star Joe DiMaggio and the two honeymooned in Japan, during which she took time to entertain soldiers in Korea. Fox had intended on casting Sheree North in Pink Tights, even testing her in Monroe's own studio wardrobe. 

When Monroe returned to Hollywood, her Fox suspension was lifted, and the studio offered her a role in the ensemble cast of Irving Berlin's There's No Business Like Show Business as a replacement project for having refused to make Pink Tights. Monroe initially refused to make There's No Business Like Show Business until her salary was upped to $3,000 a week, and until Fox assured her that her next film would be The Seven Year Itch''.

References

External links

1954 musicals
Broadway musicals